Houcine Benayada (born 8 August 1992 in Oran) is an Algerian footballer who currently plays for Botola club Wydad AC and the Algeria national team. He plays primarily as a centre-back but can also play as a right-back.

Club career
On 16 June 2015 Benayada signed a two-year contract with USM Alger. In 2016 he signed with CS Constantine, and in 2020 he joined the Tunisian team Club Africain.

Wydad AC 
On 3 September 2022, Benayada joined African champions Wydad AC as a free agent.

International career
In June 2015, after an impressive first season in the top flight with ASM Oran, Benayada was handed his first call up to Algeria national team for a 2017 Africa Cup of Nations qualifier against Seychelles. He was named on the substitute's bench for the match but did not participate.

He was a part in the 2021 FIFA Arab Cup winning team.

Honours
USM Alger
 Algerian Ligue Professionnelle 1 (1): 2015-16

CS Constantine
 Algerian Ligue Professionnelle 1 (1): 2017-18

Algeria
FIFA Arab Cup: 2021

References

External links
 
 NFT Profile

1992 births
Algerian footballers
Algeria international footballers
Algerian Ligue Professionnelle 1 players
Algerian Ligue 2 players
ASM Oran players
Living people
Footballers from Oran
USM Alger players
CS Constantine players
Club Africain players
Association football central defenders
Étoile Sportive du Sahel players
Algerian expatriate footballers
Algerian expatriate sportspeople in Tunisia
Expatriate footballers in Tunisia
Tunisian Ligue Professionnelle 1 players
21st-century Algerian people
2021 Africa Cup of Nations players